Morgan Place is an unincorporated community in Montgomery County, in the U.S. state of Ohio.

References

Unincorporated communities in Montgomery County, Ohio
Unincorporated communities in Ohio